Alexa Curtis is an American entrepreneur, writer and former radio host.  Curtis was the former host of the Radio Disney program Fearless Everyday and is the current executive producer and host of the program Fearless on Localish. She has made TV appearances and spoken at summits and universities on topics such as social media and mental health.

Early life
Alexa Curtis is from Mansfield, Connecticut. She became interested in fashion at an early age, eventually starting the blog "A Life in the Fashion Lane" when she was twelve years old in 2011. She also wrote for several fashion brands during this period and covered events such as New York, Paris, and London Fashion Weeks.

Career
Curtis started out as a fashion blogger, and began writing for periodicals such as The Huffington Post and Guest of a Guest. She was modelling professionally at age 14. Around this time, she began struggling with depression, anxiety and an eating disorder. She also experienced suicidal thoughts after experiencing cyberbullying. She changed her focus from fashion to mental health because of these experiences.

In 2018, Curtis renamed her fashion blog "Life Unfiltered with Alexa", and began covering topics such as  mental health, bullying, and social media addiction. She has written for publications such as Rolling Stone and SheKnows on these topics. These issues also led to the foundation of her non-profit organization Media Impact and Navigation for Teens, which hosts assemblies in schools in the United States that cover the aforementioned topics, along with responsibly navigating social media. She has also appeared on TV shows like Today, CTV, Good Day Sacramento, Good Morning America, and The Rachael Ray Show.

In some of her writings, she was critical of the Netflix series 13 Reasons Why, because she felt that it glorified suicide, and that if she had viewed the content when she was suicidal, "she probably would have done something". In 2017, Curtis started the weekly podcast This is Life Unfiltered. She interviews celebrities and other guest speakers on a diverse range of topics. In 2018, she launched her own radio show on Radio Disney called Fearless Every Day with Alexa Curtis. She also founded the "Be Fearless" summit,  which works with young people and connects them with mentors. The first summit was held at Drexel University in 2019. In 2021, Curtis was named to CT Insider’s 40 Under 40 list.

Selected writings
"Does 14 Reasons Why Glamorize Teen Suicide," Rolling Stone 2017.
"Dispatches from High School: Teens Talk 13 Reasons Why," SheKnows 2017.
A Millennial's Guide To Cheese Plating". Guest of a Guest. 2019.

References

External links

Living people
Date of birth missing (living people)
21st-century American businesswomen
21st-century American businesspeople
American motivational writers
American talk radio hosts
American bloggers
Year of birth missing (living people)